John Edward Bellas (16 September 1895–1977) was an English footballer who played in the Football League for Coventry City and Sheffield Wednesday.

References

1895 births
1977 deaths
English footballers
Association football defenders
English Football League players
Shildon A.F.C. players
Sheffield Wednesday F.C. players
Mansfield Town F.C. players
Coventry City F.C. players
Heanor Town F.C. players